Grzegorz Mielcarski (born March 19, 1971 in Chełmno) is a retired Polish football player.

Career

Club
He played for clubs such as Polonia Bydgoszcz, Servette Geneva (Switzerland), Górnik Zabrze, Widzew Łódź, FC Porto (Portugal), UD Salamanca (Spain), Pogoń Szczecin, AEK Athens (Greece) and Amica Wronki.

National team
He played for Poland national team.

He was a participant at the 1992 Summer Olympics, where Poland won the silver medal.

Honours
Porto
Primeira Divisão: 1995–96, 1996-97, 1997–98, 1998–99
Taça de Portugal: 1997–98
Supertaça Cândido de Oliveira: 1998

References

1971 births
Living people
People from Chełmno
Polish footballers
Poland international footballers
Olympic footballers of Poland
Olympic silver medalists for Poland
Footballers at the 1992 Summer Olympics
Servette FC players
AEK Athens F.C. players
Górnik Zabrze players
Widzew Łódź players
FC Porto players
Amica Wronki players
La Liga players
UD Salamanca players
Olympic medalists in football
Sportspeople from Kuyavian-Pomeranian Voivodeship
Medalists at the 1992 Summer Olympics
Association football forwards
Pogoń Szczecin players

Polish expatriate sportspeople in Portugal